This list includes areas designated as "geopark" on the national level. This should not be confused with members of either the European Geoparks Network or the UNESCO Global Geoparks Network.

Australia
 Kanawinka Geopark

Austria
 Kamptal Geopark

Brazil
 Geopark Paleorrota

Bulgaria
Iskar–Panega Geopark

China

Protected areas of the People's Republic of China

Czech Republic
 Bohemian-Moravian Highlands Geopark
 Blaník Knights County Geopark
 Egeria Geopark
 GeoLoci Geopark
 Iron Mountains Geopark
 Moravian-Silesian Foothills Geopark
 Ralsko Geopark

Germany
 Bergstraße-Odenwald
 Bayern–Böhmen
 GrenzWelten
 Harz - Braunschweiger Land - Ostfalen
 Inselsberg – Drei Gleichen
 Kyffhäuser
 Laacher See
 Muskau Arch
 Porphyrland
 Ries
 Ruhrgebiet
 Sachsens Mitte
 Schieferland
 Schwäbische Alb
 TERRA.vita
 Vulkaneifel
 Vulkanregion Vogelsberg
 Westerwald–Lahn–Taunus

Indonesia
 Raja Ampat Geopark 
 Gunung Krakatau Geoprak 
 Karangsambung-Karangbolong Geopark
 Merangin Geopark
 Suoh Geopark

Japan
 Chichibu Geopark

South Africa 
 Barberton Geopark
 Vredefort Meteor Impact Site

Turkey
 Ida Madra Geopark
 Kızılcahamam-Çamlıdere Geopark
 Nemrut-Süphan Geopark
 Sivas-Upper Kızılırmak Geopark
 Zonguldak Coal Geopark

United Kingdom
There are no 'national Geoparks' within the UK (as at July 2020); there are however a number of UNESCO Global Geoparks.

See also
 Protected area

References

External links

List of Global Geoparks

 List of national geoparks
Geoparks